Freakens is a 2019 Indian Malayalam-language comedy film written and directed by Anish J. Karrinad. Film produced by Edakunnil Sunil under the banner of Best Films. The film features Anandhu Mukundan, Biju Sopanam, Indrans and Kalabhavan Navas in lead roles.

Cast

Music
The film score is composed by Saanand George after Jayaram's Thinkal Muthal Velli Vare, lyrics for which are written by O.S.A. Rasheed and Anish J. Karrinad.

Release 
Freakens was released in India on 13 December 2019.

References

External links

2010s Malayalam-language films